Kondapalli Pydithalli Naidu also spelled Kondapalli Paidithalli Naidu (20 November 1930 – 18 August 2006) was a member of the 11th, 12th and 14th Lok Sabha of India. He represented the Bobbili constituency of Andhra Pradesh and was a member of the Telugu Desam Party.

External links
 Home Page on the Parliament of India's Website
 K.P. Naidu No more
 lok sabha condoled death of k.p naidu 

1930 births
People from Vizianagaram
India MPs 1996–1997
India MPs 1998–1999
India MPs 2004–2009
2006 deaths
Lok Sabha members from Andhra Pradesh
Telugu Desam Party politicians
Telugu politicians
People from Uttarandhra